Lynn Bria is an American basketball coach who as of 2019 is the head coach of the Stetson Hatters women's basketball team. Prior to being named the head coach at Stetson, Bria served in head coaching roles at Ohio, UCF, and Texas Women's University. Bria recorded her 200th win as the head coach at Stetson against Liberty on January 10, 2019.

References 

Living people
American women's basketball coaches
Stetson Hatters women's basketball coaches
Year of birth missing (living people)
University of Charleston alumni
Texas Woman's Pioneers coaches
UCF Knights women's basketball coaches
Ohio Bobcats women's basketball coaches